AFA Senior Male League or the AFA League is the top division in Anguilla, it was created in 1997. Despite being a league competition in CONCACAF, none of the Anguillan teams ever played in CFU Club Championship or CONCACAF Champions' Cup. 4,000 capacity Ronald Webster Park is a venue used for league matches.

AFA League - 2022
ALHCS Spartan
Diamond
Doc's United
Salsa Ballers (George Hill)
Attackers (The Valley-North)
Lymers
West End Predators
Roaring Lions
Eagle Claw
Uprising FC
Kicks United

Previous winners
The winners of the league are:

Performance by club

References

Football competitions in Anguilla
Top level football leagues in the Caribbean
Sports leagues established in 1997
1997 establishments in Anguilla